Dzhambechiy (Dzhambichi until 2018) is a rural locality (an aul) in Bolshesidorovskoye Rural Settlement of Krasnogvardeysky District, Adygea, Russia. The population was 574 as of 2018. There are 15 streets.

Geography 
The aul is located 6 km north from Bolshesidorovskoye, on the left bank of the Laba River.

Ethnicity 
The aul is inhabited by Adyghes.

References 

Rural localities in Krasnogvardeysky District